The Uruguayan Championship 1922 was the 22nd season of Uruguay's top-flight football league.

Overview
The tournament consisted of a two-wheel championship of all against all. It involved twelve teams, and the champion was Nacional.

This year there was a schism in Uruguayan football, Peñarol and Central being disaffiliated for disobeying the mandates of the AUF. Both clubs then founded the Uruguayan Football Federation, whose tournaments were not officially recognized by the AUF. This division between Uruguayan football organizations remained until 1925, when the Uruguayan state intervened through its president, José Serrato.

Teams

League standings

References 

Uruguay - List of final tables (RSSSF)

Uruguayan Primera División seasons
Uru
1